Bernard Brogan (born 3 April 1984) is a Gaelic footballer from the St Oliver Plunketts/Eoghan Ruadh club who previously played for the Dublin county team. He is originally from the Battery Heights. From a famous footballing family, he is the son of former All-Ireland winning and All Star player Bernard Brogan Snr and is the brother of former Dublin players Alan and Paul. His uncle Jim was also an inter-county footballer for Dublin. Alongside most of his family, Brogan has attended St. Declan's College on Navan Road.

As of 2013, he was the Gaelic footballer with the second highest number of followers on Twitter, between Paul Galvin and Michael Murphy.

Playing career

2006–2008: Early years
Brogan won the 2006 Sigerson Cup with DCU. He scored one point in the game against QUB. He was on the 2006 Plunketts team that won the Dublin Division Two League title with a win over Garda. He was named on the 2006 Dublin Bus/Evening Herald Blue Star football XV at left corner forward.

Brogan scored his first point for Dublin against Fermanagh in the 2007 NFL. He made his Championship debut for Dublin as a late sub in Dublin's quarter-final win over Meath. He made his first start for Dublin in the semi-final against Offaly, but was substituted in the 45th minute. He regained his position for the final against Laois at Croke Park, scoring 1–01 in Dublin's 3–14 to 1-14 Leinster title winning game. Along with brother Alan, he was nominated for an All Star Award in 2007 as half forward.

In 2008, Brogan won the Dublin AFL Division 1 title with his club St Oliver Plunketts Eoghan Ruadh, scoring 1–05 in the final at Parnell Park. It was the first league title in the club's history. With Dublin he won the 2008 O'Byrne Cup by beating Longford in the final.

2009–2011: Middle years
In 2009, Brogan won another Leinster title with Dublin, but his season ended with defeat to Kerry in the All-Ireland quarter-final.

After an exceptional season for Dublin on the full forward line in 2010, Brogan was awarded an All Star and was named as 2010 Vodafone Footballer of the Year.

In 2011, Brogan won an All-Ireland title with Dublin, the team's first All-Ireland since 1995. Brogan scored six points in the final against Kerry. He later revealed his celebrations were cut short as he had to do a drug test straight after the game. He passed with flying colours and resumed his celebrations.

2012–2019: Later years
In 2012, Brogan won another Leinster title when Dublin beat Meath in the final. Then he missed an absolute sitter in the All-Ireland semi-final against Mayo. The miss haunted Brogan as Dublin lost the game by a narrow margin.

Brogan won the 2013 NFL with Dublin against Tyrone at Cork. He scored five frees in the game. He then won another Leinster title against Meath and was part of the Dublin team that won the 2013 All-Ireland Senior Football Championship Final, defeating Mayo by 2–12 to 1-14. Brogan scored 2–03 in the match, was All-Ireland final man of the match and The Sunday Game named him their man of the match and included him on their team of the year.
 Brogan was then awarded an All Star for his performances in 2013.

Brogan won the 2014 NFL with Dublin but his season came to an abrupt end when Donegal defeated Dublin in that year's All-Ireland semi-final, a momentous result that sent shockwaves through the sport.

Following a third All-Ireland Senior Football title in September 2015, Brogan was appointed captain of the Ireland international rules football team for the 2015 Series against Australia.

On 24 October 2019, Brogan announced his retirement from inter-county football.	
In total Brogan played 116 games for Dublin, league and championship, scoring 36 goals and 344 points (452) making his Dublin's third top scorer of all time, behind Dean Rock (14-419; 461 in 89 games) and Jimmy Keaveney (30-402; 492 in 104 games).

Honours
Team
 13 Leinster Senior Football Championships (2006, 2007, 2008, 2009, 2011, 2012, 2013, 2014, 2015, 2016, 2017, 2018, 2019)
 7 All-Ireland Senior Football Championship (2011, 2013, 2015, 2016, 2017, 2018, 2019)
 5 National Football League (2013, 2014, 2015, 2016, 2018)
 2 O'Byrne Cups (2007, 2008)
 1 Sigerson Cup with DCU (2006) 
 1 All-Ireland U21 Football Championship (2003)
 1 Leinster Under-21 Football Championship (2005)
 1 Dublin AFL Division 1 (2007)
 1 Dublin AFL Division 2 (2006)
 1 Kildare U21 Championship (National University Maynooth) (2003)
 1 U21 'B' Hurling Championship 3cups of tea (2004)
 1 U21 'B' Football Championship (2004)
 1 International Rules Series (2015)

Individual
 4 All Stars Awards (2010, 2011, 2013, 2015)
 1 Irish Player of the International Rules Series Award (2015)
 1 All Stars Footballer of the Year (2010)
 1 Texaco Footballer of the Year (2010)
 1 GPA Footballer of the Year (2010)
 1 Opel GPA Player of the Month for August (2010)
 1 The Star Newspaper Footballer of the Year (2010)
 1 All-Ireland Senior Football Championship Final Man of the Match: (2013)

Career statistics

Other Ventures
In October 2012, Brogan and his cousin James co-founded Accounts for Legacy Sports and Entertainment. The Lucan-based consultancy, PR and event management firm now trades under the name Legacy.

In May 2016, Brogan, along with his father (Bernard Snr.) and brother Alan purchased the four-star Pillo Hotel in Ashbourne, County Meath. The purchase has been reported to have cost in the region of €8 million.

In June 2016, Brogan was launched as the face of the 'King of the Hill' advert for King Crisps, a play on both the crisps' brand name and Bernard Brogan's unofficial nickname given to him by Dublin football supporters.

In July 2017, Brogan launched his first clothing line in association with Littlewoods Ireland's brand V by Very. The collection launched with a total of 50 pieces. The following year, he launched his second V by Very collection, Bernard Brogan x.

In 2021, Brogan presented an episode of, ‘Shoulders of Giants’ commissioned by Irish Broadcaster RTÉ. In the programme, Brogan charted the life and times   of the former Dublin Gaelic Footballer, and later Manager, Kevin Heffernan, as well as the legacy he left Dublin Football. The programme aired on RTÉ on December 12th 2021.

References

External links
 
 St. Oliver Plunkett's G.A.A Club Website

1984 births
Living people
Alumni of Dublin City University
Bernard Junior
DCU Gaelic footballers
Dublin inter-county Gaelic footballers
Gaelic football forwards
People educated at St. Declan's College, Dublin
People from Castleknock
Sportspeople from Fingal
St Oliver Plunketts/Eoghan Ruadh Gaelic footballers
Winners of seven All-Ireland medals (Gaelic football)